The 2009 European Junior and U23 Canoe Slalom Championships took place in Liptovský Mikuláš, Slovakia from 22 to 26 July 2009 under the auspices of the European Canoe Association (ECA) at the Ondrej Cibak Whitewater Slalom Course. It was the 11th edition of the competition for Juniors (U18) and the 7th edition for the Under 23 category. A total of 16 medal events took place.

Medal summary

Men

Canoe

Junior

U23

Kayak

Junior

U23

Women

Kayak

Junior

U23

Medal table

References

External links
European Canoe Association

European Junior and U23 Canoe Slalom Championships
European Junior and U23 Canoe Slalom Championships